Sethu Boomi is a 2016 Indian Tamil drama film, written and directed by Kenthiran Muniasami. The film features Thaman Kumar and Samskruthy Shenoy in the lead roles, while Kenthiran Muniasami, Junior Balaiah and Singampuli in supporting roles.

Cast
Thaman Kumar as Kumaran
Samskruthy Shenoy as Malar
Kenthiran Muniasami as Sami
Cheranraj as Raasu
Junior Balaiah
Singampuli
Rajalingam
K. S. G. Venkatesh

Production
Following an average response to his first film, Ayyan (2011), Kenthiran Muniasami began working on Sethu Boomi in late 2014 and selected actors Thaman Kumar and Samskruthy Shenoy to play pivotal roles. The film was predominantly shot around Ramanathapuram and Sivagangai during early 2015. By June 2015, the team had completed the film's shoot and had begun post-production works.

Soundtrack 
Music composed by V. T. Bharathi and V. T. Monish.
"Yendi Sandali" - Ranjith	
"Singapore Scent" - M.L.R.Karthikeyan	
"Ini Neeyachu Naanachu" - Rahul Nambiar, Surmukhi	
"En Thayapola" - Kamalaja, Jagadish

Release
The New Indian Express gave the film a mixed review and stated " it is appreciable that the director has capsuled his whole story-telling to less than two hours of viewing time", while adding "with no big names to boast of in its cast or technical crew, the film had raised no expectation, so it is no disappointment either".

References

External links 
 

2016 films
2010s Tamil-language films